Zapata is a census-designated place (CDP) in and the county seat of Zapata County, Texas, United States. The population was 14,018 at the 2010 census. As an unincorporated community, Zapata has no municipal government but like all 254 Texas counties has four elected county commissioners chosen by single-member districts and a countywide elected administrative judge.

History
Zapata was named for José Antonio de Zapata (died 1839), the revolutionary commander who served in the cavalry of the Republic of the Rio Grande, of which the town was a part.  The town was relocated to higher ground in 1953 prior to the completion of Falcon Dam, which left the original town center beneath the waters of Falcon Lake.

Geography
Zapata is located at  (26.906244, -99.270007).

Recreation 
The city is located right on Falcon International Reservoir which is at the center of multiple fishing events throughout the year.

The city also served by a number of parks, most notably, Romeo Flores Park.

Climate
Zapata has a hot semi-arid (Köppen: BSh) climate with hot summers and milder winters.

Precipitation averages  annually, with higher amounts typically occurring from May to October. Zapata is sometimes the hottest location in the United States.

Demographics

2020 census

As of the 2020 United States census, there were 5,383 people, 2,010 households, and 1,037 families residing in the CDP.

2010 census
At the 2010 census, there were 5,089 people, 4,328 households and 1,265 families residing in the CDP. The population density was 666.7 per square mile. There were 2,239 housing units at an average density of 290.4 per square mile (112.1/km2). The racial makeup of the CDP was 92.38% White, 0.02% African American, 0.06% Native American, 0.18% Asian, 0.00% Pacific Islander, 6.82% from other races, and 0.55% from two or more races. Hispanic or Latino of any race were 94.99% of the population.

At the 2000 census, there were 1,574 households, of which 41.7% had children under the age of 18 living with them, 61.7% were married couples living together, 15.0% had a female householder with no husband present, and 19.6% were non-families. 18.2% of all households were made up of individuals, and 11.4% had someone living alone who was 65 years of age or older. The average household size was 3.07 and the average family size was 3.50.

31% of the population were under the age of 18, 7.4% from 20 to 24, 30.1% from 25 to 49, 15.2% from 50 to 64, and 12.9% who were 65 years of age or older. The median age was 32 years. For every 100 females, there were 92.2 males. For every 100 females age 18 and over, there were 89.8 males.

The median household income was $24,136 and the median family income was $27,708. Males had a median income of $30,833 compared with  $12,604 for females. The per capita income was $11,863. About 29.1% of families and 33.5% of the population were below the poverty line, including 45.1% of those under the age of 18 and 27.0% of those ages 65 and older.

Economy 
Leading employers in Zapata County are the educational, health and social services, natural gas and oil, and retail trade industries.

The county’s present economy is mainly centered on oil and gas production, ranching, trading and services, and tourism. Its primary employers are in the mining/energy, construction, retail trade, health care, social welfare, and the services sector. Government is also a major employer in the county.

Government

Local government
The structure of the management and coordination of city services is:

Public libraries 
The county operates the main branch of the "Olga V. Figueroa Zapata County Public Library". It is located on 901 Kennedy Street in Zapata. Aida R. Garcia is the library director. The library is known as a site for viewing Morelet’s seedeaters. This small bird draws thousands to the library grounds every year. Their computers are slightly outdated though, however that doesn't stop the children of Zapata from playing Roblox on them.

State government
Zapata is represented in the Texas Senate by Democrat Judith Zaffirini, District 28, and in the Texas House of Representatives by former Democrat, now Republican Ryan Guillen, District 31.

At the Federal level, the two U.S. Senators from Texas are Republicans John Cornyn and Ted Cruz; Zapata is part of Texas' US Congressional 28th District, which is currently represented by Democrat Henry Cuellar.

The United States Postal Service Zapata Post Office is located at 810 N US Highway 83.

The United States Border Patrol Zapata Station is located at 105 Kennedy Street.

Education 
All of Zapata County is within the Zapata County Independent School District. ZCISD is designated as Class 4A, and participates in numerous UIL academic and athletic events.  Sports offered by the school include cross country, volleyball, football, basketball, tennis, golf, track & field, softball, baseball, as well as powerlifting through the THSPA/THSWPA.

The Zapata High School Mariachi Band, Mariachi Halcon, has won the state championship in division 3A.  It was the subject of a film, Mariachi High, which was broadcast nationally on PBS in 2012 and is rated 4.5 stars on Amazon Prime.

Colleges and universities
The city is served by schools in Laredo, fifty miles to the north on U.S. Highway 83 through Laredo Community College, Main and South campuses, and Texas A&M International University. In addition, educational institutions are also available fifty miles to the south in Rio Grande City, through the Starr County campuses of both South Texas College of McAllen and the University of Texas–Rio Grande Valley of Edinburg.

Public school districts
Zapata has one school district within the county Zapata County Independent School District.

Zapata County Independent School District 
All of the schools listed here are in the city of Zapata.  All of the ZCISD section of Zapata is zoned to Zapata High School:

Public elementary and middle schools
middle high schools that serve the ZCISD portion are:
 Zapata Middle School

The elementary schools that serve the ZCISD portion are:
 Arturo L. Benavides Elementary School
 Fidel and Andrea R. Villarreal Elementary School
 Zapata North Elementary School
 Zapata South Elementary School

Youth groups 
Law Enforcement Exploring
Girl Scouts
Boys & Girls Club of Zapata County

Hang gliding 
More world records in hang gliding have been set from Zapata than any other location in the world. The World Record Encampment has been taking place at the Zapata County Airport since 2000, and the first hang glider flights to break the 308-mile barrier took place there the first year. A distance record of 438 miles was set by Mike Barber in 2002. Three new world records were set in 2005, with the current world record, 472 miles, set by Dustin Martin in July, 2012.

Transportation
Major highways in Zapata and their starting and ending points:
 U.S. Highway 83 Brownsville-Zapata-Westhope.
 Texas State Highway 16  Zapata Wichita Falls
 Farm to Market Road 496 Zapata – Falcon Mesa
 Farm to Market Road 3074 Falcon Mesa – Falcon Mesa
Zapata County Airport (FAA: APY) provides general aviation services to Zapata.

Nearby cities

Bass fishing 
Falcon International Reservoir located in Zapata is becoming well known for its bass fishing. The community hosts numerous "Winter Texans" between November and April, most residing in travel camper trailers. The lake has been decreasing in recent years.

Gallery

See also

References

External links

 

Census-designated places in Zapata County, Texas
Census-designated places in Texas
County seats in Texas